RAF Knettishall is a former World War II airfield in Suffolk. It was numbered as Station 136 by the United States Army Air Forces while home to the 388th Bombardment Group of the Eighth Air Force between 1943 and 1945.

References

Citations

Bibliography

External links 

 388th Bomb Group Memorial at Knettishall on 388th Bomb Group Association website

Airfields of the VIII Bomber Command in Suffolk
Royal Air Force stations in Suffolk